Onalaska High School is a public high school in Onalaska, Wisconsin, in the Onalaska School District. It had an enrollment of 917 students in grades 9-12 for the 2018–19 school year.

History
The first public high school in Onalaska was founded in January 1890 on a plot of land between Main, King, Fourth and Fifth Streets. The first graduating class had three students, and the school was known as the Vikings, with the school colors being red and white. The original building burned down in 1895, and a new building was built on-site the following year. After another fire in 1924 left the new building completely destroyed, all students in the Onalaska public school system moved to the former La Crosse County School of Agriculture. The school's colors changed to purple and white in the 1940s, and the "Hilltopper" moniker came soon after that due to the location of the school, dubbed "Heaven on a Hill". Another new building was built due to growing student counts in 1970.

Academics
Onalaska offers Advanced Placement classes. About half of all seniors take AP classes.

Demographics
OHS is eighty-five percent white, eight percent Asian, two percent black, two percent Hispanic and one percent American Indian, while two percent of students identify as two or more races.

Athletics
The Hilltoppers boys' basketball team has won three WIAA championships: the Class A championship in 1988, the Class B championship in 1992, and the Division 2 championship in 2012.

Performing arts
OHS has two competitive show choirs, the higher-level Hilltoppers and lower-level Express. The Hilltoppers have been a top show choir in the nation for three decades, winning a competition in Wisconsin Dells, Wisconsin in 1984. They continue to be a major force, winning six grand championships, best band, and best vocals awards in their 2020 season with their show themed after the Netflix TV series The Umbrella Academy. OHS also hosts its own competition, which is noted for being one of the toughest in the Midwest and attracts schools from Wisconsin, Minnesota and Iowa.

Notable alumni
Tim Gullikson, professional tennis player and coach
Tom Gullikson, professional tennis player and coach
Chuck Hockenbery, professional baseball player
Michael Huebsch, Wisconsin politician
Sandra Lee, professional chef and television personality
Tom Newberry, professional football player
Frank Pooler, composer
Mark Proksch, comedian and actor
Matt Thomas, basketball player for the Utah Jazz

References

External links
Onalaska High School

Public high schools in Wisconsin
Schools in La Crosse County, Wisconsin
Educational institutions established in 1890
1890 establishments in Wisconsin